Selepet Rural LLG is a local-level government (LLG) of Morobe Province, Papua New Guinea. The Selepet language is spoken in the LLG.

Wards
02. Nimbako
03. Wap
04. Sorong/Kusin
05. Dengop
06. Konimdo
07. Selepet
08. Indum 2
09. Indum 1
10. Weke
11. Dollo
12. Kamandu
13. Gilang
14. Hupat
15. Tipsit
16. Dengondo
17. Bomu/Gotoro
18. Iloko
19. Kabwum Station

References

Local-level governments of Morobe Province